Satisfaction Guaranteed typically refers to a legally-binding express guarantee of satisfaction in the contract of a sale of goods.

Satisfaction Guaranteed may also refer to:
Satisfaction Guaranteed (manga)
"Satisfaction Guaranteed" (short story), a short story by Isaac Asimov
"Satisfaction Guaranteed", a song by The Firm
"Satisfaction Guaranteed", a song by Christina Milian from her 2001 self-titled album
Satisfaction Guaranteed, a 2004 compilation album by Teddy Pendergrass
"Satisfaction Guaranteed", a song by Alyssa Reid from her 2014 album, Time Bomb
Satisfaction Guaranteed, a 2014 mixtape by Junglepussy
"Satisfaction Guaranteed", a song by Two Door Cinema Club from their 2019 album False Alarm